Thiruneedur Somanathaswami Temple (திருநீடூர் அருட்சோமநாதர் கோயில்) is a Hindu temple located at Needur in Mayiladuthurai district of Tamil Nadu, India. The historical name of the place is  Sapthapuri.  The presiding deity is Shiva. He is called as Somanathaswami. His consort is known as  Veyurutholi Ammai.

Significance 
It is one of the shrines of the 275 Paadal Petra Sthalams - Shiva Sthalams glorified in the early medieval Tevaram poems by Tamil Saivite Nayanars Tirunavukkarasar and Sundarar.

Literary mention 
Tirunavukkarasar describes the feature of the deity of Tirupunkur and Thiruneedur as:

References

External links 
 
 

Shiva temples in Mayiladuthurai district
Padal Petra Stalam